The College Hill Historic District  in Brownsville, Tennessee is a  historic district which was listed on the National Register of Historic Places in 1980 and expanded in 2015.

It is near TN 19 and U.S. 70/U.S. 79.  It is centered on the Brownsville Female College complex built in 1852.

The original district follows an irregular pattern along West College, West Main, West Margin, Key Corner Streets, and on North Grand, North McLemore and Russell Avenues and on Williamsburg Lane. It included Greek Revival, Gothic Revival, Stick/Eastlake architecture.

The original included 72 contributing buildings and a contributing structure.

The boundary increase January 27, 2015 is roughly bounded by Haralson Street, Margin Street, N. Wilson Avenue and Cherry Street.

The extension was listed on the National Register consistent with guidelines established in a 2014 study of historic resources in Brownsville.

References

Historic districts on the National Register of Historic Places in Tennessee
Greek Revival architecture in Tennessee
Gothic Revival architecture in Tennessee
Queen Anne architecture in Tennessee
Buildings and structures completed in 1824
Haywood County, Tennessee